Exalcidion carenatum is a species of longhorn beetles of the subfamily Lamiinae. It was described by Monné in 1990, and is known from Colombia.

References

Beetles described in 1990
Endemic fauna of Colombia
Acanthocinini